Pachyballus is a genus of jumping spiders that was first described by Eugène Louis Simon in 1900. While most are found in Africa and nearby regions, one species is endemic to New Caledonia. The name is a combination of the Ancient Greek  ("pachys"), meaning "thick", and the salticid genus Ballus.

Pachyballus rotundus was transferred to its own genus Planiemen in 2007 and Pachyballus oyo was transferred to Peplometus in 2020.

Species
 it contains nine species and one subspecies, found only in Africa and on New Caledonia:
Pachyballus caelestis Wesołowska, Azarkina & Wiśniewski, 2020 – Democratic Republic of the Congo
Pachyballus castaneus Simon, 1900 – South Africa
Pachyballus flavipes Simon, 1910 – Ivory Coast, Equatorial Guinea (Bioko), Tanzania, Kenya
Pachyballus f. aurantius Caporiacco, 1949 – Kenya
 Pachyballus gambeyi (Simon, 1880) – New Caledonia
Pachyballus miniscutulus Wesołowska, Azarkina & Wiśniewski, 2020 – South Africa
Pachyballus mombasensis Wesołowska, Azarkina & Wiśniewski, 2020 – Kenya
Pachyballus ornatus Wesołowska, Azarkina & Wiśniewski, 2020 – Democratic Republic of the Congo, Tanzania
Pachyballus transversus Simon, 1900 (type) – Guinea-Bissau, Congo, Zanzibar, South Africa
 Pachyballus variegatus Lessert, 1925 – Tanzania

References

External links
 Photograph of Pachyballus sp.

Salticidae genera
Salticidae
Spiders of Africa